Star is a 2001 Indian Tamil-language action film directed by Praveen Gandhi and produced by Vijaykrishna. The film stars Prashanth and Jyothika while Raghuvaran, Vijayakumar, and Praveen Gandhi play other pivotal roles. The film features songs by A.R. Rahman reused from his own Hindi films Thakshak and 1947: Earth, while the background score was composed by Sabesh-Murali due to Rahman's unavailability. The film was edited by M. N. Rajan.

Plot
Murthy earns his living taking the blame for the mistakes of other people, and so the jail is his second home. Dhanushkodi has sworn to kill ex-collector Ramanathan's son Santhosh, and so, Ramanathan has transferred Santhosh to Mauritius while telling the world he has run away. Wishing to save his son, he hires Murthy to act like him, hoping Dhanushkodi would kill him instead of his actual son. Murthy too accepts the gig since his lover Preeti is Ramanathan's niece. In the climax, Santhosh supports Dhanushkodi for killing his father, but Dhanushkodi kills Santhosh. The film ends with Murthy taking the blame for killing Santhosh and surrendering himself to the police.

Cast

 Prashanth as Murthy
 Jyothika as Preeti
 Vijayakumar as Ramanathan
 Raghuvaran as Dhanushkodi
 Praveen Gandhi as Santhosh
 Manivannan as Preeti's father
 Nizhalgal Ravi as Sundaram
 Chinni Jayanth as Software Sagalmass
 Ramesh Khanna as Jail broker
 Srividya as Vidya
 Hema Chaudhary as Preeti's mother
 Raj Kapoor as Badri
 Anu Mohan as Sub-inspector Rathnam
 Balu Anand as the Police inspector
 Pandu as Sub-inspector
 Madhan Bob as Ramanathan's assistant
 Mayilsamy as a Police constable
 Crazy Venkatesh as Dhanushkodi's henchman
 Neelu as Advocate
 Omakuchi Narasimhan as Convict
 Sukran as Nagaraj
 Vellai Subbaiah as Sivaraj
 Naga Kannan as Convict
 Scissor Manohar as Thief
 Chelladurai as Convict
 Arulmani as Dhanushkodi's henchman
 Sahadevan as Computer centre worker
 Mahadevan as Computer centre worker
 Laxmi Rattan as Rich man
 Vijay Ganesh as Thief
 Sivanarayanamoorthy as a Police officer
 Soundar as Auto rickshaw driver
 Mumtaj in a special appearance

Production
The success of Jodi (1999) prompted director Praveen Gandhi to collaborate with Prashanth and Simran again in a project called Star, but Simran soon dropped out. Praveen moved on to relaunch the film with Ajith Kumar in the lead and producers Vijayam Cine Combines. Praveen began pre-production work and cast Nagma in a proposed item number, but was later dropped from the project after falling out with Ajith. Vijayam Cine Combines moved on to instead make Dheena (2001) with Ajith, selecting debutant AR Murugadoss, an assistant of Praveen, as the project's director.

After their successful association in Ratchagan and Jodi, Praveen Kanth wanted Rahman to provide the music yet again, but the composer was short on time, so Rahman compromised to reinvent tunes earlier composed for films like Thakshak and Earth for the project. Prashanth and Jyothika were later confirmed as the lead pair, though Praveen Gandhi's sudden decision to act in the film irked Prashanth and his father, who threatened to opt out of the project, before the issue was mediated.

The introduction of Jyothika's character was filmed on the streets of Chennai. The team then went on a shooting stint to Kurinji village at Gobichettipalayam and during the time there provided Rs 2 lakhs to help renovate a temple, which had been closed for twenty years.

Release
Critic Malini Mannath gave the film a negative review adding that "an artist can rarely rise above a bad script, consequently Prashanth’s attempts to infuse some life through fight scenes and dance numbers turn futile" and that "Jyotika’s expressions are becoming repetitive.". The critic concluded that had "ruinously shoddy script" and "the director’s attempt to enter into the acting arena, and play one of the crucial characters in the film adds insult to injury". Another critic added that the film would not give a boost to Prashanth's career as he had anticipated stating that it was a "below average movie". Another reviewer described that "the messy screenplay in the second half ruins the story that admittedly has enough potential for romance, laughs, sentiments and action".

The failure of the film ended the partnership between Rahman and Praveen Kanth, with the composer refusing to score the music for the director's next venture, Thullal. Plans were made in 2003 to remake the film in Telugu as Mahendra, but the venture never took off.

Soundtrack 

A. R. Rahman was approached to compose music for the film. But, Rahman could not accept the film owing to his busy schedule. The director sought permission to re-use some songs from Rahman's Hindi film, Thakshak and one song from Earth. The director followed the same approach in his previous film Jodi. Singer Karthik made his playback debut with this soundtrack. 

The background score was composed by Sabesh-Murali due to Rahman's unavailability.

References

External links
 

2001 films
2000s Tamil-language films
Films scored by A. R. Rahman
Indian action thriller films
Films directed by Praveen Gandhi
2001 action thriller films